Davis at Large is an Irish variety and chat show which was presented by Derek Davis. The studio-based show aired on Friday nights, and later on Sunday nights, between 2 November 1984 and 23 February 1986.

Production

Davis at Large was broadcast live from Studio 1 in the RTÉ Television Centre at Donnybrook, Dublin 4. As RTÉ's biggest at the time, the studio held 120 audience members.

References

1984 Irish television series debuts
1986 Irish television series endings
Irish variety television shows
RTÉ original programming